A flag anthem is a patriotic song or ode dedicated to a flag, usually one of a country (in which case it is also known as a national flag anthem). It is often either sung or performed during or immediately before the raising or lowering of a flag during a ceremony. Most countries use their respective national anthems or some other patriotic song for this purpose. However, some countries, particularly in South America, use a distinct flag anthem for such purposes. Not all countries have flag anthems. Some used them in the past but no longer do, such as Iran and South Africa. Flag anthems can be officially codified in law, or unofficially recognized as such through mere custom and convention. In some countries, the flag anthem may be just another song, and in others, it may be an official symbol of the state akin to a second national anthem, such as in Republic of China.

List of flag anthems

Former flag anthems

References

External links

Patriotic songs
Anthems
Flags